Eugene L. Mingo (born September 22, 1938) is a former professional American football player from Akron, Ohio,   who played several positions including halfback, placekicker, and return specialist.  He is widely recognized as the first African American placekicker in American football.

He played youth football at the behest of a cousin, Dean Newby. After quitting, his cousin was angry. He called Gene a quitter, and tried to get him to come back. Shortly after, his cousin lost his life when mauled by a dog. When his aunt called him a quitter, too, he went back to football. After missing a couple of years to care for his terminally ill mother, he returned to school and found out that he excelled at football.

He later dropped out of high school and joined the Navy where he played for a Navy team and was a star. After his discharge, he returned to Akron and worked at the Goodyear plant. Reading the paper in the lead up to the inaugural 1960 season, he read about a former opponent who had played for the Army who was signed by the Denver Broncos. He wrote them a letter and received a contract. He made the team without having played any college football.

In 1960, he had the first punt return for a touchdown in the American Football League, for the Denver Broncos.  That touchdown won the first-ever American Football League game, as the Broncos defeated the Boston Patriots.  Mingo also scored the first points in Mile High Stadium, then called Bears Stadium, with an 18-yard field goal.  In the 1961 season opener at War Memorial Stadium against the Buffalo Bills, Mingo threw a touchdown pass, from the halfback position, to help the Broncos win 22-10: a 50-yarder to Lionel Taylor in the first quarter.  Mingo kicked the PATs after each score.  He led the American Football League in scoring as a rookie in 1960 with 123 points and in 1962 with 137 points.  Mingo holds the Broncos' franchise record for the longest touchdown run, an 82-yarder against the Raiders in 1962.  He also played for the Oakland Raiders, Miami Dolphins, and Washington Redskins.  He kicked for the Pittsburgh Steelers in 1969 and 1970.

On September 14, 2014, Mingo, along with Dan Reeves and Rick Upchurch, was inducted into the Broncos Ring of Fame.

See also
 List of American Football League players

References

1938 births
Living people
Players of American football from Akron, Ohio
American football placekickers
American football running backs
American football return specialists
Denver Broncos (AFL) players
Oakland Raiders players
Miami Dolphins players
Washington Redskins players
Pittsburgh Steelers players
American Football League All-Star players
American Football League players